Ganaxolone, sold under the brand name Ztalmy, is a medication used to treat seizures in people with cyclin-dependent kinase-like 5 (CDKL5) deficiency disorder (CDD). 

Ganaxolone was approved for medical use in the United States in March 2022. The US Food and Drug Administration (FDA) considers it to be a first-in-class medication.

Pharmacology

Mechanism of action
The exact mechanism of action for ganaxolone is unknown; however, results from animal studies suggest that it acts by blocking seizure propagation and elevating seizure thresholds.

Ganaxolone is thought to modulate both synaptic and extrasynaptic GABAA receptors to normalize over-excited neurons. Ganaxolone's activation of the extrasynaptic receptor is an additional mechanism that provides stabilizing effects that potentially differentiates it from other drugs that increase GABA signaling.

Ganaxolone binds to allosteric sites of the GABAA receptor to modulate and open the chloride ion channel, resulting in a hyperpolarization of the neuron. This causes an inhibitory effect on neurotransmission, reducing the chance of a successful action potential (depolarization) from occurring.

It is unknown if ganaxolone possesses significant hormonal activity in vivo, with a 2020 study finding evidence of in vitro binding to the membrane progesterone receptor.

Chemistry

Ganaxolone is an analog of the neuroactive steroid allopregnanolone which possesses no known hormonal activity and, instead, is thought to primarily function by binding to GABAa receptors as a positive allosteric modulator.

Other pregnane neurosteroids include alfadolone, alfaxolone, allopregnanolone (brexanolone), hydroxydione, minaxolone, pregnanolone (eltanolone), and renanolone, among others.

Research 
Ganaxolone is being investigated for potential medical use in the treatment of epilepsy. It is well tolerated in human trials, with the most commonly reported side effects being somnolence (sleepiness), dizziness, and fatigue. Trials in adults with focal onset seizures and in children with infantile spasms have recently been completed. There are ongoing studies in patients with focal onset seizures, PCDH19 pediatric epilepsy, and behaviors in Fragile X syndrome.

Ganaxolone has been shown to protect against seizures in animal models, and to act a positive allosteric modulator of the GABAA receptor.

Clinical trials 
The most common adverse events reported across clinical trials have been somnolence (sleepiness), dizziness, and fatigue. In 2015, the MIND Institute at the University of California, Davis, announced that it was conducting, in collaboration with Marinus Pharmaceuticals, a randomized, placebo-controlled, Phase 2 clinical trial evaluating the effect of ganaxolone on behaviors associated with Fragile X syndrome in children and adolescents.

References

External links 
 

Sterols
Anticonvulsants
GABAA receptor positive allosteric modulators
Ketones
Neurosteroids
Pregnanes
Sedatives
Orphan drugs